Muriel de Zapardiel is a municipality located in the province of Valladolid, Castile and León, Spain.

References

 Municipalities in the Province of Valladolid
 Enclaves and exclaves